Robert Norrie, MA (c.1647–1727) was an Anglican clergyman who served in the Scottish Episcopal Church as the Bishop of Brechin from 1724 to 1727.

Biography 
He was consecrated the Bishop of the Diocese of Brechin at Edinburgh on 25 July 1724 by Primus Fullarton and bishops Millar, Irvine and Freebairn. He died in office in January 1727.

References 

 
  

1647 births
1727 deaths
Bishops of Brechin (Episcopalian)
18th-century Scottish Episcopalian bishops